WMMN (920 AM) is a sports formatted broadcast radio station licensed to Fairmont, West Virginia, serving North-Central West Virginia. WMMN is owned and operated by Laurel Highland Total Communications, Inc., through licensee LHTC Media of West Virginia, Inc.

History

On November 1, 1935, WMMN joined the CBS radio network. At that time the station was licensed to A.M. Rowe Inc., with George B. Storer the chief stockholder. It operated on 890 kHz with power of 500 W (daytime) and 250 W (night).

References

External links

MMN
Sports radio stations in the United States
CBS Sports Radio stations